Joseph Lloyd Hogan (March 11, 1916 – August 27, 2000) was an American prelate of the Roman Catholic Church.  He served as the seventh bishop of the Diocese of Rochester in New York from 1969 to 1978.

Biography

Early life 
Hogan was born on March 11, 1916, in Lima, New York.  He attended St. Andrew's Seminary and St. Bernard's Seminary in Rochester.  He was ordained to the priesthood by Bishop James Edward Kearney for the Diocese of Rochester on June 6, 1942.  Hogan received a master's degree from Canisius College in Buffalo.  In 1949, Hogan received a Doctor of Sacred Theology degree from the Pontifical University of Saint Thomas Aquinas in Rome.

Hogan served on the faculty of St. Bernard's Seminary, as rector at Becket Hall residence for the diocesan seminary at St John Fisher College  and Sisters of St. Joseph Novitiate, both in Pittsford, New York.  He was appointed monsignor in 1966, and served as pastor of St. Margaret Mary Parish in Irondequoit, New York, until being appointed bishop.

Bishop of Rochester 
On October 6, 1969, Hogan was appointed bishop of the Diocese of Rochester by Pope Paul VI.  He was consecrated on November 28, 1969, by Archbishop Fulton J. Sheen.

Hogan's resignation as bishop of Rochester was accepted by Pope John Paul II on November 22, 1978.  Joseph Hogan died on August 27, 2000.

References

External links

1916 births
2000 deaths
People from Lima, New York
Roman Catholic Diocese of Rochester
20th-century Roman Catholic bishops in the United States
Religious leaders from New York (state)
Catholics from New York (state)